Malakoff–Plateau de Vanves is an underground station on line Line 13 of the Paris Métro in the commune of Malakoff. The station entrance is inside a small building at street level with both entrance and exit faregates in the middle that lead to both platforms. In the right corner you also have entrance faregates leading down to the northbound platform, and on the left you have an up escalator that allows passengers to exit the southbound platform.

The station opened on 9 November 1976 as part of the extension of line 13 from Porte de Vanves and Châtillon–Montrouge.

Station layout

Gallery

References
Roland, Gérard (2003). Stations de métro. D’Abbesses à Wagram. Éditions Bonneton.

Paris Métro stations in Malakoff
Railway stations in France opened in 1976